Conard Peak is a peak,  high, along the north side of Hearfield Glacier, about  north of Aldridge Peak, in the Cartographers Range, Victory Mountains, in Victoria Land, Antarctica. It was mapped by the United States Geological Survey from surveys and from U.S. Navy air photos, 1960–64, and named by the Advisory Committee on Antarctic Names for Ralph W. Conard, a member of the aircraft ground handling crew with U.S. Navy Squadron VX-6 at Williams Field, Ross Island, during Operation Deep Freeze 1968.

References 

Mountains of Victoria Land
Borchgrevink Coast